Siluurikaudella is the seventh album by Finnish experimental rock band Pharaoh Overlord.

It was released on CD in 2010 by Ektro Records. Its closest relative amongst Pharaoh Overlord's family tree is Doktor Kettu's Soft Delirium, another album featuring bassist Jussi Lehtisalo.

Track list

1. Vesitorni (22:32)
2. Valujuhla (12:47)
3. Piirros 3 (18:03)

Personnel

Jussi Lehtisalo
Tomi Leppänen
Janne Westerlund
Julius Jääskeläinen
Pekka Jääskeläinen

References

Pharaoh Overlord albums
2010 albums